Budmani is a surname. Notable people with the surname include:

Lukrecija Bogašinović Budmani (1710–1784), Ragusan poet
Pero Budmani (1835–1914), writer, linguist, grammarian, and philologist from Dubrovnik
Simo Budmani, merchant from Dubrovnik